Subodh Chandra Basu Mallik (9 February 1879 – 14 November 1920), commonly known as Raja Subodh Mallik, was a Bengali Indian industrialist, philanthropist and nationalist. Mallik is noted as a nationalist intellectual who was one of the co-founders of the Bengal National College, of which he was the principal financial supporter. He was close to Aurobindo Ghosh and financed the latter's nationalist publications including Bande Mataram.

Mallik was born in Pataldanga suburb of Calcutta to Prabodh Chandra Basu Mallik. He graduated from St. Xaviers College Calcutta and Presidency College Calcutta before enrolling in fine arts at Trinity College, Cambridge in 1900.

He returned from England before completing his university studies, and immediately delved into the nationalist movement. His palatial house in what was then Wellington square in Calcutta became a major hub of political activity. In 1906, Mallik was among a group of leading luminaries of Bengal who founded the National Council for Education to promote indigenous and nationalist education in higher education. His donated Rs 100,000 to support the founding of the Bengal National College. He also founded the Life of Asia Insurance Company. Mallik's political activities earned him the ire of the Raj, and he was deported in 1908 in the wake of the Alipore Bomb Conspiracy. Mallik's nationalist work and generous support of the movement earned him the colloquial title of Raja from his grateful countrymen.

In independent India, Wellington Square, the site of his palatial residence, was renamed Raja Subodh Mallik Square, while the road housing Jadavpur University, which emerged from the Bengal National College, is now called Raja Subodh Mallik Road.

References

Further reading

External links 
 Subodh Chandra Mullick at Site of Sri Aurobindo and The Mother (2016 archived copy)
 Residence & Hub of Nationalists at Lakshmi's House - Sri Aurobindo Institute

Mallik, Subodh Chandra
Mallik, Subodh Chandra
19th-century Indian educators
19th-century Indian politicians
20th-century Indian educators
20th-century Indian politicians
Alumni of Trinity College, Cambridge
Anushilan Samiti
Bengali Hindus
20th-century Bengalis
19th-century Bengalis
Indian independence activists from Bengal
Indian National Congress politicians from West Bengal
Indian sociologists
Politicians from Kolkata
Prisoners and detainees of British India
Mallik, Subodh Chandra
Mallik, Subodh Chandra
Indian educators
Indian philanthropists
Educators from West Bengal